The following list of countries by age structure sorts the countries of the world according to the age distribution of their population. The population is divided into three groups:

 Ages 0 to 14 years: children.
 Ages 15 to 64 years: working population or adults.
 Over the age of 65: elderly, senior citizens.

The age structure of a country has a strong impact on society and the economy. If the proportion of 0–14-year-olds is very high, there may be a so-called youth bulge. If, on the other hand, the proportion of over 65 is very high, the social systems of a country can be heavily burdened.

List 
All numbers are for the year 2020. Source is The World Factbook.

Visual statistic 
Visualization based on data above

References 

Age structure
Age structure
Demographic lists